Dobrzyń Land is a historical region in central-northern Poland. It lies northeast of the Vistula River, south of the Drwęca, and west of the Skrwa. The territory approximately corresponds with the present-day powiats of Lipno, Rypin, and half of Golub-Dobrzyń within the Kuyavian-Pomeranian Voivodeship, although it encompasses parts of other counties as well. Totally, it has about 3,000 km2 and 200,000 inhabitants. Its historic capital is Dobrzyń nad Wisłą, which gave its name to the entire region. Its largest town is Rypin.

History
The region became part of the emerging Polish state under duke Mieszko I of Poland (960–992). Upon the death of his descendant Duke Bolesław III Wrymouth in 1138, it was allocated to the newly established Duchy of Masovia, a provincial duchy of Poland. In his Prussian Crusade, Duke Konrad I of Masovia in 1228 established the Order of Dobrzyń of German knights (fratribus militiae Christi in Prussia), whom he vested with the Dobrzyń estates. Soon after however, this order was absorbed by the Teutonic Knights, who had established the Order's State in the adjacent Chełmno Land. During the whole second half of 13th century it belonged to Kuyavian Piasts, the new branch of Mazovian dynasty. Finally, along with their other states, it became a part of reunited Kingdom of Poland.

During the Polish–Teutonic War of 1326–1332, the forces of the Order's State occupied Dobrzyń Land, which however was relinquished to the Kingdom of Poland in the 1343 Treaty of Kalisz. The Knights temporarily regained control in the Polish–Lithuanian–Teutonic War of 1409–1411, but after their defeat at the Battle of Grunwald had to return it again according to the Peace of Thorn. It was incorporated into the Inowrocław Voivodeship of the Greater Poland Province of the Polish Crown and the Polish–Lithuanian Commonwealth. Nevertheless, it has been still in the Mazovian Diocese of Płock (and not in the Greater Polish Diocese of Włocławek).

Dobrzyń Land was annexed by Prussia during the Second Partition in 1793, and included within the newly formed province of South Prussia. It was administered with New East Prussia from 1795 onwards, until in 1807 it became part of the Napoleonic Duchy of Warsaw according to the Treaties of Tilsit. In 1815 however, following the duchy's dissolution, it was attached to so-called Congress Poland under the Russian Empire. After World War I, in 1918, Dobrzyń Land passed to the re-established independent Second Polish Republic. In 1920, Poland repulsed a Soviet invasion of the region.

Following the joint German-Soviet invasion of Poland, which started World War II in September 1939, it was occupied by Nazi Germany. During the occupation, the Polish population was subjected to various crimes, such as mass arrests, imprisonment, slave labor, kidnapping of children, deportations to Nazi concentration camps and extermination, incl. the Intelligenzaktion. Major sites of massacres of Poles in the region included Skrwilno, Rusinowo, Karnkowo and Rypin. In 1945, the German occupation ended and the region was restored to Poland.

Miscellanea

The region has numerous lakes and descendants of yeomanry (drobna szlachta, similar as Mazovia). There are six towns in the region: Golub-Dobrzyń, Górzno, Lipno, Skępe, Rypin and the historic capital Dobrzyń nad Wisłą. Cities of Toruń and Włocławek, as well as towns of Ciechocinek and Sierpc, lie just besides its border. Its oldest officially crowned sanctuary of Our Lady is Skępe; another is Obory. Ecclesiastically, it is divided between the dioceses of Włocławek and Płock. After 1793, it has been part of administrative units with the capital in Płock and Warsaw; since 1938 it belonged to Toruń and Włocławek. Dialectologically, it is usually adjoined to Chełmno Land. Therefore, it is considered as the transitory subregion between three neighbouring regions of Kuyavia, Mazovia and Chełmno Land, with which it had close historical ties at various times.

See also 
 Ziemia
 Chełmno Land
 Kuyavia

References

External links
 Ziemia Dobrzyńska On-line 

Historical regions in Poland
Historical regions